South Taranaki is a territorial authority on the west coast of New Zealand's North Island that contains the towns of Hāwera (the seat of the district), Manaia, Ōpunake, Patea, Eltham, and Waverley. The District has a land area of 3,575.46 km2 (1,380.49 sq mi) and a population of   It is part of the greater Taranaki Region.

The district straddles the boundary separating the Wellington and Taranaki provinces, resulting in the town of Waverley celebrating Wellington Anniversary Day in January, and the town of Patea 15 kilometres away celebrating Taranaki Anniversary Day in March.

Council facilities include the South Taranaki LibraryPlus, Mania, Kaponga, Patea, Eltham, Opunake, Hāwera and Waverley libraries.

History 
The South Taranaki District was established as part of the 1989 local government reforms, merging Egmont, Eltham, Hawera, Patea and Waimate West counties.

Demographics

South Taranaki District had a population of 27,534 at the 2018 New Zealand census, an increase of 954 people (3.6%) since the 2013 census, and an increase of 1,047 people (4.0%) since the 2006 census. There were 10,668 households. There were 13,971 males and 13,566 females, giving a sex ratio of 1.03 males per female. The median age was 38.5 years (compared with 37.4 years nationally), with 6,219 people (22.6%) aged under 15 years, 4,719 (17.1%) aged 15 to 29, 12,264 (44.5%) aged 30 to 64, and 4,332 (15.7%) aged 65 or older.

Ethnicities were 80.6% European/Pākehā, 27.6% Māori, 2.2% Pacific peoples, 3.4% Asian, and 1.8% other ethnicities. People may identify with more than one ethnicity.

The percentage of people born overseas was 8.9, compared with 27.1% nationally.

Although some people objected to giving their religion, 51.0% had no religion, 35.8% were Christian, 0.7% were Hindu, 0.3% were Muslim, 0.3% were Buddhist and 3.3% had other religions.

Of those at least 15 years old, 2,007 (9.4%) people had a bachelor or higher degree, and 6,162 (28.9%) people had no formal qualifications. The median income was $28,800, compared with $31,800 nationally. 2,862 people (13.4%) earned over $70,000 compared to 17.2% nationally. The employment status of those at least 15 was that 10,398 (48.8%) people were employed full-time, 3,051 (14.3%) were part-time, and 942 (4.4%) were unemployed.

Governement
The current mayor is Phil Nixon. The deputy mayor is Robert Northcott.

References

External links

 South Taranaki District Council